Mian Sara or Miyansara may refer to:
 Mian Sara, Gilan
 Mian Sara, Mazandaran
 Mian Sara, Razavi Khorasan